Benny Murphy is a former Gaelic footballer who played for the Fermanagh county team for more than 20 years and in 2005 was picked at right corner-back on the Fermanagh Team of the Century. He played his club football with Kinawley. His son Ollie won two All Ireland medals with Meath in 1996 and 1999.

References

Fermanagh inter-county Gaelic footballers
Kinawley Gaelic footballers
Living people
Year of birth missing (living people)